Prathapa Siriwardene (born 2 July 1989) is a Sri Lankan cricketer. He is a right-handed batsman and right-arm medium-fast bowler who plays for Singha Sports Club. He was born in Galle.

Siriwardene made his List A debut during the 2009–10 season, against Seeduwa Raddoluwa. From the tailend, he scored 7 runs. He took figures of 0–19 with the ball from two overs of bowling.

External links
Prathapa Siriwardene at CricketArchive 

1989 births
Living people
Sri Lankan cricketers
Singha Sports Club cricketers
Cricketers from Galle